No More Love, No More Death is a 1993 Hong Kong action film directed by Herman Yau and starring Jacky Cheung, Rosamund Kwan and Carina Lau. The film is a prequel to the 1992 film, With or Without You, and was produced in response to the popularity of Cheung's character, "Prince".

Plot
Triad leaders White Tiger (Chan Yuen) and Green Dragon (Michael Chan) become enemies while fighting for the objection of Yuk-fung (Yip San). Tiger abducts the child Prince and fabricates a story of how his mother was abducted by Dragon. Since then, Prince was determined to study martial arts in order to kill Dragon and rescue his mother. Prince was trained by Tiger to be a killer, and killing Dragon have become Prince's goal.

One day, when Prince (Jacky Cheung) had the chance to kill Dragon, he sees his dream lover, Tweedy (Rosamund Kwan), and as a result, fails to kill Dragon, breaking his reputation of never making mistakes on missions. Prince's assistant, Ching-ching (Carina Lau), whom is deeply in love with him, arranges Tweedy to seemingly disappear for a while for the sake of him. However, Prince mistakenly believes that Ching-ching betrayed him and killed Tweedy and begins to drink heavily. Because he thinks Tweedy is dead, Prince feels hopeless.

Later, Tiger calls Dragon out to meet with him, telling him that Prince is actually Dragon's son, a fact that Prince did not expect. When Tiger and Dragon were arguing who is truly Prince's father, Tiger points his gun at Prince and blames Prince for his resentments. During a battle, Ching-ching gets shot and killed by Tiger in order to protect Prince. Afterwards, Prince sadly carries Ching-ching away, reminiscing a time when Ching-ching asked him whether he will cry when she dies. Later, Tweedy also tells Prince that Ching-ching entrusted her to not meet with him until he kills Dragon. Prince did not say a word, and silently watches the distant sunset with Tweedy.

Cast
Jacky Cheung as Prince
Rosamund Kwan as Tweedy
Carina Lau as Ching-ching
Chin Ho as Mute killer
Hacken Lee as Cop
Michael Chan as Green Dragon
Chan Yuen as White Dragon
Wong Siu-lung as Cop
Lisa Tung as Lisa
Tip San as Yuk-fung
So Wai-nam as Bodyguard
Lam Kwok-kit as Bodyguard
Lee Ka-hung as Bodyguard
Wong Kar-leung as Policeman in elevator
Jim James as Judge

Reception

Critical reception
LoveHKFilm gave the film a mixed review citing cheesy production values and "nothing really makes sense", but also noting how "the production design and cinematography are overblown to entertaining distraction, and the stars are welcome ones nowadays."

Box office
The film grossed HK$6,917,896 at the Hong Kong box office during its theatrical run from 16 to 29 April 1993.

See also
Jacky Cheung filmography

References

External links

No More Love, No More Death at Hong Kong Cinemagic

1993 films
1993 action films
1993 martial arts films
Hong Kong action films
Hong Kong martial arts films
Gun fu films
Triad films
Cantonese-language films
Films directed by Herman Yau
Films about contract killing
Films set in Hong Kong
Films shot in Hong Kong
Films directed by Taylor Wong
1990s Hong Kong films